Siege of Érsekújvár may refer to:

  Siege of Érsekújvár (1621), took place during Gabriel Bethlen's Revolt
 Siege of Érsekújvár (1663), took place during the Austro-Turkish War (1663–64)
 Siege of Érsekújvár (1685), took place during the Great Turkish War